Sylvie Bouchet Bellecourt (born 3 July 1957) is a French nurse and politician of the Republicans who became a member of the National Assembly since 2020, representing Seine-et-Marne's 2nd constituency. She did not seek re-election in the 2022 French legislative election.

References

External links 
 Official webpage at the National Assembly

Living people
1957 births
Deputies of the 15th National Assembly of the French Fifth Republic
The Republicans (France) politicians
People from Bondy
Women members of the National Assembly (France)
21st-century French women politicians
21st-century French politicians
French nurses